Swimming With Dolphins is an American electronica band from Minneapolis, Minnesota. Austin Tofte and Owl City frontman Adam Young formed the band in 2008, later featuring vocals from Breanne Düren. The name of the band was derived, according to Tofte, from "some old Jacques Cousteau documentaries from the 80s". Though Young was never the front man or lead singer, he performed synths and programming for the act.  He also served as the producer of the group.

For the act, Tofte and Young created trademark outfits. Tofte took on the appearance of a submariner wearing a classic scuba suit and Young donned a pilot's mask (which would later become Sky Sailing's trademark look).

History 

The band made its debut with the release of their 2008 EP, Ambient Blue. In addition to the main release, the band also put out a cover version of Tracy Chapman's "Fast Car" as B-sides single to the EP. The song "Silhouettes", off the release, featured Breanne Düren, who then proceeded to join Owl City's live band shortly after being introduced to Young through Tofte. Later that same year, Tofte, along with Düren, provided Young with backing vocals for a few songs on his debut Owl City album, Maybe I'm Dreaming.

Young departed the band in late 2008 as Owl City's popularity began to increase.  Alone, Tofte signed Swimming With Dolphins on to Tooth & Nail Records in mid-2010. About a year later, Tofte released Swimming With Dolphin's first full-length album Water Colours under Tooth & Nail in 2011. On August 5, 2011, Swimming With Dolphins uploaded the official music video for the first single off the record, "Sleep To Dream", via YouTube.

After Young's departure, Tofte was joined by Sarah Beintker and Torrie James as part of his live band. Beinker contributed her vocals to the songs "Holiday" and "Sleep To Dream" off Water Colours. The release also featured the artists Sunsun and Mod Sun.

Since 2011, Austin Tofte has released a few singles independently under Swimming With Dolphins and had a successful Indiegogo campaign to fund the project's upcoming album, Catharsis. In September 2013, Tofte did an interview with Chris Herlihy's weekly syndicated radio show and talked about the release. Also in September, Swimming With Dolphins released a preview of the new album in the form of a single instrumental track, entitled "Tromsø", via SoundCloud. Swimming With Dolphins also posted a video for "Tromsø" via Vimeo around the same time. 

According to Tofte in 2014, the album was very near completion. On August 21, Tofte stated that the track listing for the album would be revealed shortly. On August 29, Tofte released the raw rough draft of the track listing for the album as well as the cover art for a single entitled "Summer Skin", which is to be on the album. On September 23, "Summer Skin" was released to Swimming With Dolphins' SoundCloud. On December 18, Tofte announced that a big update on Catharsis was to be released soon. On May 1, 2015, Tofte revealed the album art for Catharsis as well as its release date of August 4, 2015. Tofte instead released the single "Iron Lungs" instead, saying he needed to "take a step back to recalibrate and determine a new release date" due to the premature announcement.

On January 11, 2016, to celebrate "Iron Lungs" hitting 5,000 streams on SoundCloud, Tofte released a reworked version of "Summer Skin" for the final version of Catharsis.  On May 6, he released a new single, "Let You Love." On April 1, 2018, after an over year-long hiatus from making music, Tofte released a sample of "Roller Dancer", which will be released on Catharsis. As of January 2023, the album still has no release date.

Besides Swimming With Dolphins, Tofte was also a member of Owl City's live touring band in 2008.

Discography 
Studio albums
 Water Colours (2011)
EPs
 Ambient Blue (2008)
Singles
 "Fast Car" (cover) (2008)
 "Sleep To Dream" (2011)
 "Tromsø" (2013)
 "Summer Skin" (2014)
 "Iron Lungs" (2015)
 "Let You Love" (2016)

References

External links

Musical groups from Minnesota
American electronic music groups
2008 establishments in Minnesota
American synth-pop groups